Madera Peak is a 10,509-foot-elevation (3,203 meter) mountain summit located in the Sierra Nevada mountain range in Madera County, California, United States. It is situated in the Ansel Adams Wilderness on land managed by Sierra National Forest. Madera Peak is the southernmost summit of an ancient ridge from which the Clark Range formed. Precipitation runoff from this landform drains into tributaries of the San Joaquin River.

History
This geographical feature was originally named "Black Peak", but the Madera County Chamber of Commerce petitioned for the name to be changed to perpetuate the name of the county, thus the "Madera Peak" toponym was officially adopted in 1932 by the U.S. Board on Geographic Names. Madera County derived its name from the town of Madera, which in turn was laid out by the California Lumber Company in 1876. "Madera" is the Spanish language word for "wood".

The first ascent of the peak is unknown, however a cairn without a record was found on the summit in August 1931 by Hermina Daulton, Mr. and Mrs. Garthwaite and their seven-year-old son, Ted.

Climate
According to the Köppen climate classification system, Madera Peak is located in an alpine climate zone. Most weather fronts originate in the Pacific Ocean and travel east toward the Sierra Nevada mountains. As fronts approach, they are forced upward by the peaks (orographic lift), causing them to drop their moisture in the form of rain or snowfall onto the range.

Gallery

See also
 
 Geology of the Yosemite area

References

External links
 Weather forecast: Madera Peak
 Madera Peak / Vandeburg Lake (photo): Flickr

Sierra National Forest
Mountains of Madera County, California
Mountains of the Ansel Adams Wilderness
North American 3000 m summits
Mountains of Northern California
Sierra Nevada (United States)
Mountains of the Sierra Nevada (United States)